The Parliament of Southern Ireland was a Home Rule legislature established by the British Government during the Irish War of Independence under the Government of Ireland Act 1920. It was designed to legislate for Southern Ireland, a political entity which was created by the British Government to solve the issue of rising Irish nationalism and the issue of partitionism, while retaining the whole of Ireland as part of the United Kingdom.

The parliament was bicameral, consisting of a House of Commons (the lower house) with 128 seats and a Senate (the upper house) with 64 seats. The parliament as two houses sat only once, in the Royal College of Science for Ireland in Merrion Street. Due to the low turnout of members attending, the parliament was adjourned  and was later officially disbanded by the Irish Free State (Agreement) Act 1922.

History
Under the Act of Union 1800 the separate Kingdoms of Ireland and Great Britain were merged on 1 January 1801, to form the United Kingdom of Great Britain and Ireland. Throughout the 19th century Irish opposition to the Union was strong, occasionally erupting in violent insurrection.

In the 1870s the Home Rule League under Isaac Butt sought to achieve a modest form of self-government, known as Home Rule. This was considered more acceptable by British parliamentarians as Ireland would still remain part of the United Kingdom but would have limited self-government. The cause was then pursued by Charles Stewart Parnell and two attempts were made by Liberal ministries under British Prime Minister William Ewart Gladstone to enact home rule bills, accompanied by a revival of Ulster's Orange Order to resist any form of Home Rule. The First Home Rule Bill was defeated in the Commons by 30 votes; the second Second Home Rule Bill was passed, but then defeated in the Lords.

On 11 April 1912, the Prime Minister, H. H. Asquith, introduced the Third Home Rule Bill which allowed for more autonomy than its two predecessors had. It was defeated twice, but after its defeat for the third time in the Lords the Government used the provisions of the Parliament Act 1911 to override the Lords and send it for Royal Assent, which was received and the bill placed on the statute books on 18 September 1914. However, with the outbreak of the First World War, it was decided that the bill's implementation should be suspended, leading to the passing of the Suspensory Act 1914, which was presented for Royal Assent simultaneously with both the Home Rule Bill and the Welsh Church Act 1914, and ensured that Home Rule would be postponed for the duration of the conflict and would not come into operation until the end of the war. Initially the suspension was not considered an issue by Nationalists, who believed a form of independent self-government had finally been granted. Moreover, like almost everyone else in Europe at that time, Irish nationalists expected the war to be a short one.

Two attempts were made by the Asquith coalition ministry and the Lloyd George ministry to implement the Government of Ireland Act 1914 during the war, first in May 1916, which failed to reach agreement with Unionist Ulster, then again in 1917 with the calling of the Irish Convention chaired by Horace Plunkett. It consisted of Nationalist and Unionist representatives who, by April 1918, only succeeded in agreeing a report with an 'understanding' on recommendations for the establishment of self-government. Starting in September 1919, with the Government, now led by David Lloyd George, committed under all circumstances to implementing Home Rule, the British cabinet's Committee for Ireland, under the chairmanship of former Ulster Unionist Party leader Walter Long, pushed for a radical new idea. Long proposed the creation of two Irish home rule entities, Northern Ireland and Southern Ireland, each with unicameral parliaments. An amendment to the bill in the House of Lords submitted by Lord Oranmore and Browne added a Senate for Southern Ireland, intended to bolster representation of the southern Unionist and Protestant minorities. The government opposed this on the grounds that it would weaken the function of the inter-parliament Council of Ireland, but it was passed, as was an amendment adding a Senate of Northern Ireland.

After the 1918 general election, those elected as MPs for Sinn Féin met in Dublin in 1919 and established Dáil Éireann as an abstentionist parliament and declared independence for the Irish Republic.

House of Commons

The House of Commons consisted of 128 members who were styled as members of parliament with a presiding officer known as the Speaker of the House of Commons. The basic features of the House were modelled on those of the House of Commons of the United Kingdom. The franchise was the same as for Westminster elections under the Representation of the People Act 1918: men over 21 and women over 30. The voting method for elections to the Commons was the single transferable vote with the act prescribing 16 members being elected from multi-member borough constituencies, 104 from multi-member county constituencies and 8 being elected from graduates of Irish Universities. The borough and county constituencies replaced those used for Westminster elections with new multi-member ones. The university constituencies were broken down into four seats for Dublin University and four for the National University.

Election

On 24 May 1921, elections were held for the House of Commons of Southern Ireland, the same day as the elections for Northern Ireland. No contests occurred as all 128 MPs were returned unopposed, with Sinn Féin winning all 124 seats which made up the borough and county constituencies and the seats allocated to the National University of Ireland, and Unionists the four seats for graduates of Dublin University. Dáil Éireann chose to regard that election as elections to the Second Dáil. The 124 Sinn Féin candidates elected, plus the six Sinn Féin members elected to the House of Commons of Northern Ireland elected at the same time (five of whom also had seats in Southern Ireland), assembled as the Second Dáil.

June 1921 meeting
On 28 June 1921, the House of Commons and the Senate formally assembled in the Royal College of Science for Ireland, now Government Buildings, in Merrion Street, for a State Opening by Viscount FitzAlan of Derwent, the last Lord Lieutenant of Ireland. Only the four Unionist MPs attended the Commons. After electing Gerald Fitzgibbon to be Speaker, the House adjourned . This was the only formal meeting of the House.

January 1922 Treaty ratification meeting

The Anglo-Irish Treaty was signed in London on 6 December 1921 by representatives of the British Government and envoys of the Irish Republic who claimed plenipotentiary status. On 7 January 1922, Dáil Éireann ratified the Treaty. However, in accordance with its terms, the Anglo-Irish Treaty needed also to be ratified "at a meeting of members of the Parliament elected for constituencies in Southern Ireland" and the British Parliament.

A meeting in the Mansion House was convened on 14 January 1922 by Arthur Griffith as Chairman of the Irish Delegation of Plenipotentiaries (who had signed the Anglo-Irish Treaty) of "members of the Parliament elected for constituencies in Southern Ireland". Griffith's actions led to discussions between the Irish Treaty delegation and the British Government over who had authority to convene the 'meeting' as under the Government of Ireland Act 1920 the Lord Lieutenant of Ireland (then Viscount FitzAlan of Derwent) was the office-holder with the entitlement and power to convene a meeting of the House of Commons of Southern Ireland. The meeting was attended by 64 pro-Treaty Sinn Féin TDs and four Unionist MPs from the University of Dublin; it elected Alderman Liam de Róiste, one of the representatives of Cork Borough, as chairman (although at this time Eoin MacNeill was Ceann Comhairle of Dáil Éireann), duly ratified the Treaty and nominated Michael Collins for appointment as Chairman of the Provisional Government. Collins was installed in his post by the Lord Lieutenant in Dublin Castle on 16 January 1922 and formed the Provisional Government of Ireland. The members at this meeting did not take the British Oath of Allegiance, which was required by MPs in the House of Commons.

Senate

The Senate of Southern Ireland was the upper house of the Parliament of Southern Ireland established by the Government of Ireland Act 1920. The Senate convened in 1921 but was boycotted by Irish nationalists. Fifteen members attended its first meeting, and it sat only three times.

Composition
The Fourth Home Rule Bill provided for a Senate of 64 members. The composition was specified in the Second Schedule, and the mode and time of selection in the Fourth Schedule. The bill stipulated that the membership be composed of:
 3  members:
 The Lord Chancellor of Ireland, intended as the presiding officer of the Senate. The Lord Chancellor had previously been the chairman of the Irish House of Lords in the Parliament of Ireland prior to its abolition.
 The Lord Mayor of Dublin and the Lord Mayor of Cork.
 17 "Representatives of Commerce (including Banking), Labour, and the Scientific and Learned Professions" to be nominated by the Lord Lieutenant of Ireland for a term of 10 years.
 44 members elected by various interest groups from among their respective memberships, using the single transferable vote for 10-year terms, except for county councillors.
 4 Archbishops or Bishops of the Catholic Church holding Sees situated wholly or partly in Southern Ireland.
 2 Archbishops or Bishops of the Church of Ireland holding Sees situated wholly or partly in Southern Ireland.
 16 Peers (not necessarily members of the Peerage of Ireland) who were taxpayers or ratepayers in respect of property and had residences in Southern Ireland.
 8 Members of His Majesty's Privy Council in Ireland of no less than two years standing who were taxpayers or ratepayers in respect of property in and had residences in Southern Ireland.
 14 Representatives of county councils, for a term of three years, with:
 4 from each of Leinster, Munster, and Connaught
 2 from the three Ulster counties not in Northern Ireland (Cavan, Donegal, and Monaghan)

In practice, however, only forty senators were selected, as the labour movement, the Catholic Church and the county councils (controlled by Sinn Féin) refused to co-operate. Of those elected, many had participated in the Irish Convention of 1917–18. Of the incomplete membership, not all attended its few sessions. Some were subsequently members of the Free State Seanad (upper house), either appointed by W. T. Cosgrave, President of the Executive Council, or elected by the members of the Dáil (lower house).

Donal O'Callaghan was Lord Mayor of Cork throughout the existence of the Senate, but was also returned for Cork Borough in the 1921 election to the House of Commons of Southern Ireland. Section 18(4) of the 1920 Act precluded anyone from sitting in both Houses at once; but since O'Callaghan boycotted both, the question was moot in his case.

Meetings
The Senate assembled three times, though its chairman, Sir John Ross, the Lord Chancellor of Ireland, was too ill to attend. Only 15 senators attended its first meeting. Since 124 of the 128 members of the House of Commons of Southern Ireland boycotted that chamber, the Parliament could not function. On 21 June 1921, the week before its first meeting, the Senate sent a petition to David Lloyd George, the Prime Minister of the United Kingdom, arguing for more powers for the Parliament, and stating it would not serve in the event that the elected lower house was replaced by a body appointed by the Lord Lieutenant.

Abolition
The Irish Free State (Agreement) Act 1922 was passed on 31 March 1922 by the British Parliament. It gave the force of law to the Anglo-Irish Treaty, which was scheduled to the Act. Section 1(2) of the Act provided that for the purposes of giving effect to Article 17 of the Treaty the Parliament of Southern Ireland would be dissolved within four months from the passing of the Act. The Parliament of Southern Ireland ceased to exist on 27 May 1922, when Viscount FitzAlan of Derwent, the Lord Lieutenant of Ireland, formally dissolved it and by proclamation called "a Parliament to be known as and styled the Provisional Parliament". An election to this Provisional Parliament was held on 16 June 1922. On 6 December 1922, the Constitution of the Irish Free State came into force and Southern Ireland ceased to form part of the United Kingdom. The Oireachtas of the Irish Free State was a bicameral parliament consisting of Dáil Éireann and Seanad Éireann.

See also
Irish Home Rule Movement
Irish Republic
Parliament of Northern Ireland, set up under the same legislation to legislate for Northern Ireland
Peerage of Ireland

Notes

References

Bibliography
 
 

Southern Ireland (1921–22)
Historical Irish legislatures
1921 establishments in Ireland
1922 disestablishments in Ireland
Defunct bicameral legislatures